Korkmazlar is a 1988 German television series and educational cassette created by Erman Okay. The series shows the daily life of a Turkish family in Germany  and focuses on their problems which arise in part from an inadequate command of German language and its relation to Turkish and German neighbors. The Korkmaz family consists of a mother Pembe, mistress of the house, father Dursun,  daughter Hatim, the problem child Cengiz,  and the youngest daughter Sanem. Eight 30 minute episodes aired in 1988.

Cast
Emire Erhan-Neubauer: Pembe Korkmaz
Yaman Okay: Dursun Korkmaz
Figen Canatalay: Hatime Korkmaz
Mürtüz Yolcu: Cengiz Korkmaz
Basak Aslan: Sanem Korkmaz
Cetin Ipekkaya: Tayfun
Asuman Arsan: Schwiegermutter
Erdoğan Egemenoğlu: Erol
Christine Neubauer: Andrea
Gundula Rapsch: Christine
Levent Kirca: Sadri
Kaya Gürel: Ömer

Episode list 
Los, Pembe! 
Das Mißverständnis 
Sanems List 
Der Verdacht 
Die Krise 
Der Unfall 
Der Urlaub 
Die Suche nach dem Schatz

See also
List of German television series

References

German educational television series
1988 German television series debuts
1988 German television series endings
Turkish-language television
Turkish-language television shows
Das Erste original programming